The 2004 NRL season (also known as the 2004 Telstra Premiership due to sponsorship from Telstra) was the 97th season of professional rugby league football in Australia, and the seventh run by the National Rugby League. Fifteen clubs competed during the regular season before the top eight finishing teams contested the finals series. The Canterbury-Bankstown Bulldogs defeated the Sydney Roosters in the 2004 NRL grand final and in doing so claimed their eighth premiership.

Pre-season
The beginning of the season was largely overshadowed with several Bulldogs players questioned by police in relation to an alleged rape of a 20-year-old Coffs Harbour woman. An independent investigator, former New South Wales chief of detectives, would later fail to find any evidence of misconduct on behalf of the players, and no charges were pressed.

The 2004 World Club Challenge was held on Friday, 13 February 2004, at the Alfred McAlpine Stadium, Huddersfield, England. The game was contested by Bradford Bulls and Penrith Panthers and won by the home team.

The salary cap for the 2004 season was A$3.25 million per club for their 25 highest-paid players.

Regular season
Due to a perceived emphasis in the game on defence, NRL referees were instructed to call out "surrender tackle" this season when ball carriers submit at the ruck, signalling the defence to slow down the tackle in order for defenders to reset.

The first round of the season began on Friday, 12 March with 2003 champions, the Penrith Panthers losing 14–20 to the Newcastle Knights before a crowd of 19,936 at Penrith Stadium.

During a match between the Broncos and the Tigers, the Broncos fielded 14 men at one stage of the Campbelltown Stadium match. In the 60th minute, Brisbane's Shane Webcke knocked out by Tiger Bryce Gibbs. Corey Parker was brought onto the ground while Webcke was still being assisted off. Parker immediately scored off a Darren Lockyer pass and started a Broncos revival (they trailed 24–8 at halftime) which later saw them win 24–32. But, after the fourteenth man was investigated, the Broncos were stripped of the two competition points, which were reinstated weeks later.

A significant comeback was seen in a round 25 clash between the St George Dragons and Manly. Trailing 34–10 after 53 minutes, St. George Illawarra came back to win the match 36–34. This match stood in second-place in the rankings of the biggest comebacks in Australian premiership history.

Several players and coaches also made the headlines for the wrong reasons. Jamie Lyon walked out on the Parramatta club after the first round citing burnout and dissatisfaction with living in Sydney, and would later move to the UK for a successful Super League career. Coaches Daniel Anderson and Paul Langmack would have their contracts terminated at the New Zealand Warriors and South Sydney Rabbitohs respectively.

Andrew Johns was injured in Newcastle's third game of the season against Parramatta, and subsequently missed the remainder of the season. The Knights missed the finals of the NRL for the first time since 1996.

2004 was also notable for the emergence of teenage players Sonny Bill Williams (Bulldogs) and Karmichael Hunt (Brisbane Broncos), and their performances, mature beyond their years, would be critical to the fortunes of their clubs.

A quirk of the draw meant that the Sydney Roosters did not play a premiership match in Queensland during the season, while there was only one Queensland derby contested during the regular season, in round six in Townsville.

The grand finals:

  Canterbury Bulldogs vs  Sydney Roosters (NRL)
  St George Illawarra Dragons vs  Sydney Roosters (NSW Cup)
  Cronulla Sharks vs  Sydney Roosters (NSW Jersey Flegg Cup)

The winners in all grades were:

  Canterbury Bulldogs (Seniors Grade)
  Sydney Roosters (NSW Cup)
  Sydney Roosters (NSW Jersey Flegg Cup)

The test match

  Australia vs {leagueicon|New Zealand|16}} New Zealand

The State Of Origin Series

  Queensland vs {leagueicon|New South Wales|16}} New South Wales

Teams
The line-up of fifteen teams for the 2004 premiership remained unchanged from the previous season.

Advertising
In 2004 the NRL and their advertising agency MJW Hakuhodo continued with their use of the Hoodoo Gurus' 1987 hit "What's My Scene" with reworked lyrics as "That's My Team".

In addition to the big 60-second season launch TV commercial, three shorter executions were produced: one targeting young men, another targeting women and one aimed at families. In a year where sexual assault allegations damaged perceptions and the reputation of the code, retaining female fans was seen as a massive challenge.

Statistics and records
Anthony Minichiello ran 4,590 metres with the ball in 2004, more than any other player in the competition.
Hazem El Masri's tally of 342 points from 2004 still stands as the individual record for most points scored in a season in Australian club rugby league history.
The St. George Illawarra Dragons's club record for their biggest comeback was set at 24 points when they came from 34–10 down with only 25 minutes remaining to win 36–34 against the Manly-Warringah Sea Eagles.
The Brisbane Broncos' 10–0 loss to the Cowboys was their first ever against the Townsville-based club, and the first time they had been held scoreless in Queensland.
The Wests Tigers were held scoreless in consecutive weeks (rounds 15 and 16), those two rounds, the Tigers conceded 50+ points, a 50–0 loss to St. George Illawarra Dragons in round 15 and a 56–0 loss to the Sydney Roosters in round 16. Also the Tigers were held scoreless twice against the Roosters, the other time, a 22–0 scoreline in round 9.
The North Queensland Cowboys' round 25 clash against the Wests Tigers was their first match broadcast by the Nine Network since round 1, 1995.

Ladder

Finals series
To decide the grand finalists from the top eight finishing teams, the NRL adopts the McIntyre final eight system.

The North Queensland Cowboys qualified for the finals for the first time in their ten-year history, and shocked everybody by finishing just one game short of the grand final. During the finals, they won their first ever game against Queensland rivals Brisbane, thus ending the career of Brisbane stalwart Gorden Tallis. Also retiring after the 2004 finals series were Brad Fittler, Ryan Girdler and Kevin Campion.

St. George Illawarra Dragons almost capped a remarkable comeback when they trailed 24–0 only after half an hour of play to come back to only lose 31–30 against the Penrith Panthers in the first Qualifying Final. In doing so St. George Illawarra became the first team to finish fifth to bow out after the first week of the finals, giving Penrith a home preliminary final; despite leading 8–4 at halftime in their preliminary final against Canterbury, they lost 30–14, thus ending their premiership defence.

Another notable game was the seventh-placed North Queensland Cowboys reaching the finals for the first time and upsetting the second-placed and competition favourites the Canterbury-Bankstown Bulldogs 30–22 in the 3rd qualifying final. North Queensland also defeated the Brisbane Broncos for the first time ever during the semi finals but were unable to reach the grand final when they lost to the Sydney Roosters in the Preliminary Final.

The North Queensland vs Brisbane semi-final was originally fixtured to be played at Aussie Stadium, however, at the behest of both clubs, and in accordance with Aussie Stadium management, the NRL agreed to move the game to Dairy Farmers Stadium in Townsville. North Queensland won the game 10–0, giving them their first ever win over Brisbane and eliminating from the finals in the process. The game was Broncos' captain and club legend Gorden Tallis' last, who coincidentally was born and raised in Townsville.

The Canterbury-Bankstown Bulldogs claimed their 8th premiership title by beating the Sydney Roosters in the grand final.

¹ Game relocated to Dairy Farmers Stadium, the Cowboys' home ground, from Aussie Stadium. Cowboys designated home team despite the Broncos finishing higher on the table.

Finals Chart
{{8McIntyre

| RD1-team1= Sydney''
| RD1-score1=38| RD1-team8= St. George Illawarra
| RD1-score8=30

| RD1-team2= Canberra
| RD1-score2=12
| RD1-team7= Penrith| RD1-score7=31| RD1-team3= Canterbury
| RD1-score3=22
| RD1-team6= Melbourne| RD1-score6=31| RD1-team4= North Queensland| RD1-score4=30| RD1-team5= Brisbane
| RD1-score5=14

| RD2-team1= North Queensland| RD2-score1=10| RD2-team2= Brisbane
| RD2-score2=0

| RD2-team3= Melbourne
| RD2-score3=18
| RD2-team4= Canterbury| RD2-score4=43| RD3-team1= Sydney| RD3-score1=19| RD3-team2= North Queensland
| RD3-score2=16
| RD3-team3= Penrith
| RD3-score3=14
| RD3-team4= Canterbury| RD3-score4=30| RD4-team1= Sydney
| RD4-score1=13
| RD4-team2= Canterbury| RD4-score2=16}}

Grand Final

Player statistics
The following statistics are as of the conclusion of Round 26.Top 5 point scorersTop 5 try scorersTop 5 goal scorers'''

2004 Transfers

Players

Sources and Footnotes

External links
 NRL official website